Hacıyusuflar can refer to:

 Hacıyusuflar, Elmalı
 Hacıyusuflar, Yenice